= Allan Segura (model) =

Spanish model (born 1998)

- Born: 1998 (age 27–28); Benidorm, Spain
- Education: University of Valencia
- Occupations: Model; social worker; social media influencer

Allan Segura (born 1998) is a Spanish model, social worker, and social media influencer from Benidorm, Spain.

Segura studied social work at the University of Valencia. He was the first trans man to participate in Mr. Gay Pride España, representing Valencia in 2021.

Allan Segura is openly gay. He is a transgender rights activist. His work includes efforts to expand visibility and representation of gay trans men. He enjoys playing football and going to the gym.
